The 2003 Broadland District Council election took place on 1 May 2003 to elect members of Broadland District Council in England. This was on the same day as other local elections.

Election result

References

2003 English local elections
May 2003 events in the United Kingdom
2003
2000s in Norfolk